National Highway 26 (NH 26), (previously National Highway 43), is a National Highway in India, that connects Bargarh in Odisha and passes through Odisha to connect with Rajapulova in Vizianagaram district of Andhra Pradesh. It connects National Highway 5 and National Highway 6 and transverses the Eastern Ghats.

Route 

Termination
The north terminus, Borigumma is a junction of 2 highways: NH 26 to Bargarh; and NH 63, towards Jagdalpur. The south end, Rajapulova, is on NH16, that runs between Kolkata and Chennai.

See also
 National Highways Development Project
 List of National Highways in India by highway number

References

National highways in India
National Highways in Odisha
National Highways in Andhra Pradesh